Coordination Council may refer to:

 Coordination Council (Afghanistan)
 Coordination Council of Leftist Forces, a political alliance in Azerbaijan
 Coordination Council (Belarus), an opposition council of Belarusians aiming to transfer power from Aleksander Lukashenko
 Islamic Development Coordination Council, Iran, founded in 1980
 Council for Coordinating the Reforms Front, Iran, also known as the  Reformist Front Coordination Council, founded in 1999
  Coordination Council of Islamic Revolution Forces, Iran, founded in 2000
 
 Russian Opposition Coordination Council

See also